Imperial Buttery or Yuchashanfang was a division of the Imperial Household Department in charge of cooking ordinary meals for the Qing court.

References

Government of the Qing dynasty
Royal and noble courts
Kitchen